Paul Miles may refer to:

Musicians
 Paul Miles, vocalist & banjo player for the late-1920s / early-1930s string band The Red Fox Chasers
 Paul Miles, American drummer who played on the album Screams and Whispers album by the band Anacrusis
 Paul Miles, American guitarist who co-wrote & played on the album Zoon by the band The Nefilim

Others
 Paul Miles (politician) (born 1963), member of the Western Australian Legislative Assembly
 Paul O. Miles (born 1967), American short story writer of slipstream fiction
Paul Miles (American football) (born 1952), American football running back
 Paul Miles, author of the book Sex Tips from Rock Stars

See also
 Paul Miles-Kingston (born 1972), British opera singer